The 1902–03 season was Stoke's 14th season in the Football League.

After two seasons of narrow escapes the 1902–03 season provided Stoke fans a welcome relief as they finished in sixth place and could have won the league but failed to win their last four fixtures.

Season review

League
After a couple of desolate campaigns it did seem that the 1902–03 season would, bring some progress as the club attempted to build on a somewhat poor defence. A fine half-back was now taking shape with Tom Holford flanked by local players George Baddeley and James Bradley. This trio played together 74 times for Stoke at senior level and became a formidable midfield three. But perhaps the most significant signing at this time was that of 27-year-old inside-left Arthur Capes signed from Nottingham Forest. He became captain of the side and provided a useful number of goals for Stoke in his two seasons with the club. The directors also visited Scotland, again to sign Jack Forrest from Motherwell but after scoring twice on his debut against Wolverhampton Wanderers he was unable to settle in the Potteries and left for Bradford.

An ultimate sixth-place finish in the table does not exaggerate the work put in by both Cowlishaw and Austerberry for this was Stoke's best season so far in League football. In fact after a hard fought 0–0 away at Sunderland on Good Friday, Stoke were lying fourth and had a mathematical chance of taking the title. But they only won one of their remaining four games allowing Sheffield Wednesday to win the league.

FA Cup
In the FA Cup Stoke accounted for Glossop and Nottingham Forest before bowing out 3–0 to Derby County.

Final league table

Results
Stoke's score comes first

Legend

Football League First Division

FA Cup

Squad statistics

References

Stoke City F.C. seasons
Stoke